60S ribosomal protein L11 is a protein that in humans is encoded by the RPL11 gene.

Function 

Ribosomes, the organelles that catalyze protein synthesis, consist of a small 40S subunit and a large 60S subunit. Together these subunits are composed of 4 RNA species and approximately 80 structurally distinct proteins. This gene encodes a ribosomal protein that is a component of the 60S subunit. The protein belongs to the L5P family of ribosomal proteins. It is located in the cytoplasm. The protein probably associates with the 5S rRNA. Alternative splice variants encoding different isoforms may exist, but they have not been fully characterized. As is typical for genes encoding ribosomal proteins, there are multiple processed pseudogenes of this gene dispersed through the genome.

Interactions 

RPL11 has been shown to interact with:
 BLMH, 
 Mdm2, 
NOP53, 
 P16, 
 P53,  and
 Promyelocytic leukemia protein

References

Further reading

External links 
  GeneReviews/NCBI/NIH/UW entry on Diamond-Blackfan Anemia

Ribosomal proteins